Weaver Nunataks is a cluster of nunataks just south of Meyer Hills in the Heritage Range. Mapped by United States Geological Survey (USGS) from surveys and U.S. Navy air photos, 1961–66. Named by Advisory Committee on Antarctic Names (US-ACAN) for William E. Weaver, United States Antarctic Research Program (USARP) meteorologist at Ellsworth Station, 1962.

Nunataks of Ellsworth Land